Vřesová is a municipality and village in Sokolov District in the Karlovy Vary Region of the Czech Republic. It has about 400 inhabitants.

Economy
Vřesová is known for the large industrial complex of Sokolovská uhelná. The company is one of the main Czech companies operating in the energy sector, focuses on electricity generation and lignite mining and processing.

References

Villages in Sokolov District